Ouargla (Berber: Wargrən) is the capital city of Ouargla Province in the Sahara Desert in southern Algeria. It has a flourishing petroleum industry and hosts one of Algeria's universities, the University of Ouargla. The commune of Ouargla had a population of 133,024 in the 2008 census, up from 112,339 in 1998, and an annual population growth rate of 1.7%. However, including the commune of Rouissat, found in Ouargla's urban area, gives a total population of 191,136.

Historical Ouargla 

According to Ibn Khaldun the town was founded by Banu Wargla who, accompanied by sections of the Maghrawa and Banu Ifran, left the Tlemcen region and founded Ouargla. These Berbers of Ouarghla then embraced Ibadi doctrines, which later made the town an attractive refuge for the citizens of Tahert.

In the 11th century, Banu Hilal, an Arab tribe living between Nile and Red Sea, settled in Tunisia, Tripolitania (western Libya) and Constantinois (eastern Algeria) which was Ouargla party.

In the 19th century, the town was known for being on a caravan route to the south, and a starting point for exploring the southern Sahara.

Modern Ouargla 
The city was a significant tourist attraction until the civil unrest of the 1990s. Many tourists shopped for sand roses at the souk l'ehjar, the old rock market. The souq, or market, had many traditional shops filled with antiquities, traditional crafts, and local items - from dresses to stuffed lizards. The area across from these shops was used to display sand roses, mineral specimens, of all sizes and shapes. The market has gone through a renovation process.

Not far from the souk l'ehjar  is the old groceries market, or the Sunday market as it is called by the locals. It too is located in the centre of the old city, La Kasbah. At its centre the original old market is shaped as a circle split into small arcs. The central circular structure is now a meat market, surrounded by rows of grocers' and farmers' stalls displaying all sorts of fruit and vegetables.

Next to the old groceries market lie the two oldest mosques of the city, "al-Masjid al-Atiq" which literally means "the old mosque," and the old Ibadi mosque, home to one of the most renowned Islamic scholars of the city, Taleb et-Tayeb.

Some of Ouargla's population speak the Wargli language, which is part of the Zenati languages subgrouping of the Northern Berber languages. There are Wargli speakers in N'Goussa as well.

Climate
Ouargla has a desert climate ( Koppën Classification  BWh ) typical of the Sahara Desert in which it is located. The city has very long and extremely hot summers and short and pleasant winters. The average temperatures of the city are the highest of the big cities of Algeria which Ouargla is part of. The heat becomes persistent and unpleasant in summer with temperatures sometimes exceeding . The year with the most days with a temperature equal to or greater than 100 °F was in 2014 with 99 days, while the lowest total was 39 days in 1981.

The climate is particularly arid and not very rainy with clear skies most of the time. The most arid year was that of 1929 with 0 mm. Precipitation is quite scarce most of the year in Ouargla and occurs at every opportunity in a small quantity quickly evaporated by the heat of the sun which quickly regains the upper hand. The year of 1903, which was the rainiest in Ouargla, still had nine constant months with a rainfall of 0 mm, from February to October.

On average, Ouargla rarely sees days with a minimum temperature below 0°C . However, if one moves away from the urban area of Ouargla, frost is much more frequent in the periphery of the city. The record for the number of days below zero was in 1983 with 7 days during the month of January and 7 days during the month of December for a total of 14 days. The city sees an average of 5 days below 0°C per year. The winter with the most frost in Ouargla was from 1999 to 2000 with a total of 55 days. Snow is very rare in Ouargla, and only occurs in exceptional cases and in a small quantity.

Music
Peter Chatman, known as Memphis Slim, a piano blues musician, composed and performed a boogie-woogie instrumental tune named "Ouargla" in 1971. He was accompanied by Michel Denis on drums. The piece pays tribute to the Ouargla oasis, which was a famous and popular hangout in the late 1960s and early 1970s.

Localities
The commune is composed of 15 localities:

Mekhadma
Beni Thour
Ville de Ouargla
Saïd Otba Est
Saïd Otba Ouest
Ba Mendil
Bouameur
Bour El Haïcha
Sidi Amrane
Gharbouz
Sidi Boughoufala
Melala Ksar
Hassi Miloud
Zone d'Activité
Delalha (Sidi Amrane)

See also

 Berbers and Islam
 University Kasdi Merbah Ouargla

References

External links
 University of Ouargla official website

Communes of Ouargla Province
Cities in Algeria
Province seats of Algeria